Veltin School for Girls was a private school founded by Louise Veltin in 1886 in Manhattan, New York. Veltin and Isabelle Dwight Sprague Smith were the school's principals.

The school was initially located at 175 West 73rd Street, but moved in 1892 to a five-story building located at 160–192 W. 74th Street. It prepared girls for education at Wellesley, Bryn Mawr, Vassar, Barnard and other colleges. In addition to classrooms, it had an art department, study rooms, an auditorium, a library and a gymnasium. It was particularly noted for its French language and art instruction and advanced classes, like physics, astronomy, and physiology. Robert Henri taught art, and Frank and Clara Damrosch taught music. It was also called, or also had, the Veltin Studio at the location.

Lillian Link, a graduate of the school, led an effort to raise the funds among other alumni for the construction of the Veltin Studio at the MacDowell Colony in Peterborough, New Hampshire, in 1912 in honor of Louise Veltin's role as an educator and philanthropist. Veltin sat on the board of the MacDowell Colony, and Link was later a resident artist at the colony. Link also managed the fund-raising for the Isabelle Sprague Smith Studio in 1915. Sprague Smith was a member of the MacDowell Club and a corporate member of the MacDowell Colony memorial association.

The school was sold in 1924 to the De La Salle Institute. It is now the site of the Robert L. Beir Lower School Building of the Calhoun School, a co-educational private school.

Notable people
Staff
 Clara Damrosch, music teacher
 Frank Damrosch, music teacher
 Robert Henri, art teacher beginning in 1900
 Edna Boies Hopkins, art teacher beginning 1900
Students
 Dorothy Arnold, socialite
 Agnes Crimmins, playwright
 Mildred Esterbrook, social welfare leader and among many roles, national director of the Girl Scouts
 Malvina Hoffman, sculptor
 Susanne Langer, philosopher, educator and writer
 Lillian Link, sculptor
 Grace Hamilton McIntyre, artist
 Katharine Rhoades, artist
 Kay Swift, composer
 Helen Damrosch Tee-Van, artist

References

Defunct schools in New York City
1886 establishments in New York (state)
Girls' schools in New York City